The West Indies cricket team toured India from 6 November to 11 December 2011. The tour consisted of three Test matches and five One Day Internationals (ODIs). On day three of the First Test, Indian batsman Sachin Tendulkar became the first cricketer to pass 15,000 runs in Test cricket.

Squads

Test series

1st Test

2nd Test

3rd Test

ODI series

1st ODI

2nd ODI

3rd ODI

4th ODI

5th ODI

Notes

References

External links
 Future tour program

2011 in Indian cricket
2011 in West Indian cricket
Indian cricket seasons from 2000–01
International cricket competitions in 2011–12
2011